Neil Grant may refer to:
 Neil Grant (musician), Scottish composer of football club anthems
 Neil Grant (potter) (born 1938), New Zealand artist
 Neil F. Grant (1882–1970), English journalist, playwright